Gauri Bazar is a town and a nagar panchayat in Deoria district  in the state of Uttar Pradesh, India.

Demographics
 India census, Gauri Bazar had a population of 6224. Males constitute 54% of the population and females 46%. Gauri Bazar has an average literacy rate of 62%, lower than the national average of 79.9%: male literacy is 67%, and female literacy is 56%. In Gauri Bazar, 11% of the population is under 6 years of age.

Villages
Indupur
Deogaon
Damar Bishwa
Pandey Bishwa
Pachohia
Rampur
Gauri Buzurg
Navgaaonwa
Patharahat
Raishari
Kharaoh
Kakwal
Labkani
Kalavan
Karmaazipur
Pokhar bhinda
Langadi
Keshobari
Karjahi
Badhhara
Bansahiya
Narayanpur Tiwari

Gauri BazarReferences

Cities and towns in Deoria district